Derby County is an English association football club based in Derby, Derbyshire. The club was formed in 1884 but didn't appoint a full-time manager until 1896; prior to this the team for each match was selected by committee, a common practice in the early days of professional football. This chronological list comprises all those who have held the position of manager of the first team since 1896. Each manager's entry includes his dates of tenure and the club's overall competitive record (in terms of matches won, drawn and lost), honours won and significant achievements while under his care. Caretaker managers are included, where known, as well as those who have been in permanent charge. Derby have had 26 full-time managers. The most successful of these is Brian Clough, who won the club's first ever Football League title and reached the semi-final of the European Cup. The club's longest-serving managers were Jimmy Methven and George Jobey, who managed the club for 16 years, with Jobey being in charge for a club-record 629 games.

Managers

Notes

References 

Managers
 
Derby County